John G. Williams (born December 31, 1946) was a Conservative MP representing Edmonton—St. Albert in the Canadian parliament from  1993 to 2008. He was born in Aberdeenshire, Scotland. Originally associated with the Reform Party, he was a member of the Conservatives since its formation in 2003.

He was a long-time chair of the Public Accounts Committee in the House of Commons of Canada.

In August 2006, he announced that he would not be seeking re-election in the next federal election.

References

External links
 

1946 births
Canadian Alliance MPs
Canadian Presbyterians
Conservative Party of Canada MPs
Living people
Members of the House of Commons of Canada from Alberta
People from Aberdeenshire
People from St. Albert, Alberta
Reform Party of Canada MPs
Scottish emigrants to Canada
21st-century Canadian politicians